Berquist & Nelson Drugstore Building is a historic drugstore at 105 N. Main Street in Lindsborg, Kansas. It was built in c.1880 and added to the National Register of Historic Places in 2009.

It is a two-story brick commercial building which "is distinguished by its corbelled parapet and shaped metal window hoods."  It has a stone foundation and a flat roof.

References

Commercial buildings on the National Register of Historic Places in Kansas
Buildings designated early commercial in the National Register of Historic Places
Commercial buildings completed in 1880
Buildings and structures in McPherson County, Kansas
1880 establishments in Kansas
Lindsborg, Kansas
National Register of Historic Places in McPherson County, Kansas